The Airborne Redback is an Australian two-seat flying wing ultralight trike designed and produced by Airborne Windsports.

The aircraft is named for the native Australian Redback spider.

Design and development
It features a cable-braced hang glider-style high-wing, weight-shift controls, a two-seats-in-tandem open cockpit, tricycle landing gear and a single engine in pusher configuration.

The aircraft's Wizard model wing is made from bolted-together aluminium tubing, with its single surface covered in Dacron sailcloth. Its  span wing is supported by a single tube-type kingpost and uses an "A" frame control bar. The standard powerplant is the  Rotax 503 twin cylinder, air-cooled, two-stroke aircraft engine.

When introduced the Redback was a single configuration model, with no cockpit fairing and no options available. In 2012 the model has evolved and offers tundra tires, intake and exhaust silencer, training bars and an aero-tow system as optional equipment.

Reviewers Noel Bertrand et al., writing about the no-options approach in 2003 said, "The Red Back only exists in one configuration with no options — an intelligent course of action taken by this Australian manufacturer made possible by the very complete specification...All the right ingredients are there; Australian and American pilots adore them."

Variants
Redback Wizard
Initial model circa 2003 with  Rotax 503, the Wizard wing and no options available.
X-Series Redback
Later version circa 2012 with  Rotax 503, the Wizard-3 wing and limited options.

Specifications (Redback Wizard)

References

External links

2000s Australian ultralight aircraft
Single-engined pusher aircraft
Ultralight trikes